Marcel Dallemagne (11 December 1898 – 30 December 1994) was a French professional golfer who won several prestigious tournaments in Europe in the 1930s and 1940s.

Tournament wins (18)
This list may be incomplete.
1927 Belgian Open
1930 French Closed Championship
1932 French Closed Championship
1931 Swiss Open
1933 Dutch Open
1935 French Closed Championship
1936 French Open
1937 Italian Open, French Open, Swiss Open, Belgian Open, French PGA Championship, French Closed Championship
1938 French Open
1939 French PGA Championship, French Closed Championship
1948 French PGA Championship
1949 Swiss Open

Results in major championships

Note: Dallemagne only played in The Open Championship.

CUT = missed the half-way cut
"T" indicates a tie for a place

Team appearances
France–Great Britain Professional Match (representing France): 1929

References
where2golf.com 

French male golfers
Sportspeople from Yvelines
1898 births
1994 deaths